Ramadan Darwish (born 29 January 1988) is an Egyptian judoka.

Career
Darwish won a bronze medal at the 2009 World Championships in Rotterdam -100 kg. In 2015 he also won the bronze medal during the World Masters in Rabat. He is a multiple-time African Champion (six times). He also won Grand Prix in Qingdao (2009), Tashkent (2014 and Budapest in 2015. In 2016 he won gold at the Euro Open in Sofia.  He competed at the 2012 Summer Olympics in the -100 kg event and was defeated in the first round, and at the 2016 Summer Olympics in the same event.  He was more successful in 2016, reaching the quarterfinals by beating Dominic Dugasse in his first match and José Armenteros in the last 16 before losing to Elmar Gasimov.  Because Gasimov reached the final, Darwish entered the repechage, where he lost to Karl-Richard Frey so Ramadan Darwish ended up with the 7th place in Rio 2016.

References

External links
 
 
 

1988 births
Living people
People from Gharbia Governorate
Egyptian male judoka
Olympic judoka of Egypt
Judoka at the 2012 Summer Olympics
Judoka at the 2016 Summer Olympics
Mediterranean Games gold medalists for Egypt
Competitors at the 2009 Mediterranean Games
Competitors at the 2013 Mediterranean Games
African Games gold medalists for Egypt
African Games silver medalists for Egypt
African Games medalists in judo
Mediterranean Games medalists in judo
Competitors at the 2011 All-Africa Games
Competitors at the 2019 African Games
Judoka at the 2020 Summer Olympics
21st-century Egyptian people